Awendaw is a small fishing town in Charleston County, South Carolina, United States. The population was 1,294 at the 2010 census. Awendaw is part of the Charleston, South Carolina metropolitan area.

History 
Awendaw was named by the Sewee tribe. Awendaw is thought to mean "Red Clay". It is also home to an oyster shell mound created by the Sewee tribe. It is the northernmost shell ring in a group that stretches south to the tip of Florida. Most of the mound is still intact. The rest of it was destroyed to construct roads and homes for the citizens of Awendaw. Awendaw was settled in 1696 as Wappetaw by settlers from Salem, Massachusetts, who had left after the Salem Witch Trials. The town was heavily damaged by Hurricane Hugo in September 1989, but did not receive as significant damage in 2004 when Hurricane Gaston made landfall in the region. In 1992, the town of Awendaw was first incorporated and elected Willam H. Alston as the first mayor. Alston served as mayor until 2009.

The Sewee Mound was listed on the National Register of Historic Places in 1970.

Geography
Awendaw is located in northeastern Charleston County, along U.S. Route 17 at  (32.986445, -79.643451). US 17 leads southwest  to Charleston and northeast  to Georgetown.

Demographics

2020 census

As of the 2020 United States census, there were 1,399 people, 514 households, and 328 families residing in the town.

2000 census
As of the census of 2000, there were 1,195 people, 400 households, and 312 families residing in the town. The population density was 144.3 people per square mile (55.7/km2). There were 443 housing units at an average density of 53.5 per square mile (20.7/km2). The racial makeup of the town was 64.60% African American, 34.39% White,  0.08% Asian, 0.59% from other races, and 0.33% from two or more races. Hispanic or Latino of any race were 0.92% of the population.

There were 400 households, out of which 33.8% had children under the age of 18 living with them, 54.8% were married couples living together, 19.8% had a female householder with no husband present, and 22.0% were non-families. 20.3% of all households were made up of individuals, and 7.3% had someone living alone who was 65 years of age or older. The average household size was 2.97 and the average family size was 3.47.

In the town, the population was spread out, with 29.5% under the age of 18, 7.5% from 18 to 24, 27.8% from 25 to 44, 23.8% from 45 to 64, and 11.4% who were 65 years of age or older. The median age was 36 years. For every 100 females, there were 91.2 males. For every 100 females age 18 and over, there were 87.8 males.

The median income for a household in the town was $35,250, and the median income for a family was $42,917. Males had a median income of $31,696 versus $21,422 for females. The per capita income for the town was $15,781. About 13.5% of families and 12.4% of the population were below the poverty line, including 12.6% of those under age 18 and 18.1% of those age 65 or over.

Government 
The town is run by an elected council government system.

Mayor 
 Miriam C. Green

Council members
 Robert A. Causey
 Wilson Dingle
 Bryan McNeal, Jr.
 Gene T. Penninger
 Sheila Powell
 Rodney Porcher

Administrator
 Bill Wallace

Town Clerk
 Gregory Saxton

Landmarks
The  WCSC-Tower is one of the world's tallest constructions.

In 2001, the town's public library was opened as the Awendaw Community Library. Currently named the William H. Alston Municipal Public Library, it is one of two municipal public libraries in the state.

In 2011, Tractor Supply Company opened a new store. It was the first national chain to open in Awendaw.

Education 
Charleston County School District operates public schools in Awendaw.

In 2016 school district staff stated that they were considering having a new Lincoln High School built in Awendaw. The previous Lincoln High School in McClellanville closed in 2015.

As of January 2017, the school district is moving forward with plans for a new high school in Awendaw.  Location to be a 184-acre tract on Doar Rd.

Blue Crab Festival 
To many Awendaw citizens, crabbing is a hobby and one of the town's main economic resources. Every year in the summer, the town has the Blue Crab Festival. Started by the town’s first mayor William H Alston and his wife Minnie E Alston.

Notable people

 Danielle Howle, singer-songwriter

References

External links
 Town of Awendaw official website
 

Towns in Charleston County, South Carolina
Towns in South Carolina
Charleston–North Charleston–Summerville metropolitan area
Populated places established in 1696
Populated coastal places in South Carolina
1696 establishments in South Carolina